Utz Aichinger (born 13 June 1938) is a West German field hockey player. He competed in the 1968 Summer Olympics.

References

External links
 

1938 births
Living people
Field hockey players at the 1968 Summer Olympics
Olympic field hockey players of West Germany
Sportspeople from Stuttgart